The Sango people (or Basango, Bosango, Sangho, Sangos) are an ethnic group living on the banks of the Ubangi River in the Central African Republic. They speak a Northern Ngbandi-based creole language called Sango, which belongs to the Ubangian branch of the Niger-Congo family.

See also 
List of ethnic groups of Africa

References

Bibliography 

Pierre Kalck, "Sango", in Historical Dictionary of the Central African Republic, Scarecrow Press, 2005 (3rd ed.), p. 174 ; reported by Auguste Chevalier in Journal des africanistes, 1936, 6-2, pp. 238-239.
Antonin-Marius Vergiat, Les rites secrets des primitifs de l'Oubangui, Payot, 1936, reissued at L'Harmattan, Paris, 1981, 210 p.  

Ethnic groups in the Central African Republic
Ethnic groups in the Democratic Republic of the Congo